Danish Documentary Production, formerly Danish Documentary, is a documentary film production company based in Copenhagen, Denmark. The firm is based at Kvæsthusgade 5.

History
Danish Documentary Production was founded in 2007 and is led by directors and executive producers Eva Mulvad, Pernille Rose Grønkjær and Mikala Krogh.

Filmography
Danish Documentary/Danish Documentary Production has produced the following films:
 Cairo skrald (2009) 
 Fever (2010) 
 Hjemmefronten - fjenden bag hækken (2010) 
 Love addict - historier om drømme, besættelse og længsel (2011) 
 Ballroom Dancer  (2011) 
 Det gode liv (2011) 
 Kongens foged (2012) 
 Kongens foged - sat på gaden (2012) 
 Kongens foged - sat på gaden (2012) 
 En mors kamp for et normalt liv (2012) 
 Free the mind (2012) 
 Ai Weiwei The Fake Case (2013) 
 Something Better to Come (2014) 
 Ekstra Bladet: uden for citat  (2014) 
 Slottet (2014) 
 Så meget godt i vente (2014) 
 Mand falder (2015) 
 Aquarela (2016) 
 BUGS (2016) 
 Amateurs in Space (2016) 
 A Year of Hope (2017) 
 Den anden side (2017) 
 A Modern Man (2017) 
 Auf Safari (2017)
 I Walk (2019) 
 Love Child (2019)
 School of Seduction (2019) 
 Hunting for Hedonia (2019) 
 Kirsebæreventyret (2019) 
 The Cave (2019) 
 Apolonia, Apolonia (2020) 
 The Missing Films (2020) 
 The Heart is a Lonely Hunter (2020) 
 Solutions (2020)

References

External links
 Danish Documentary Prioduction on IMDb

Film production companies of Denmark
Mass media companies based in Copenhagen
Danish companies established in 2007
Companies based in Copenhagen Municipality